Asako Serizawa is a Japanese writer who is the recipient of PEN/Open Book Award in 2021, The Story Prize Spotlight Award, Massachusetts Book Award, Pushcart Prize, Rona Jaffe Foundation Writers' Award and two times recipient of O. Henry Award. She is the fellow of Civitella Ranieri Foundation and National Endowment for the Arts.

Bibliography

References 

Living people
21st-century Japanese short story writers
21st-century Japanese women writers
National Endowment for the Arts Fellows
O. Henry Award winners
Year of birth missing (living people)